A clothes line, also spelt clothesline and also known as a washing line, is a device for hanging clothes on for the purpose of drying them. It is any type of rope, cord, or twine that has been stretched between two points (e.g. two sticks), outside or indoors, above the level of the ground. Clothing that has recently been  washed is hung along the line to dry, using clothes pegs or clothespins. Washing lines are attached either from a post or a wall, and are frequently located in back gardens, or on balconies. Longer washing lines often have props holding up sections in the middle due to the weight of the usually wet clothing.

More elaborate rotary washing lines save space and are typically retractable and square or triangular in shape, with multiple lines being used (such as the Hills Hoist from Australia). Some can be folded up when not in use.

In Scotland, many tenement buildings have a "drying green", which is a communal area predominantly used for clothes lines – it may also be used as a recreational space - as well as a clothes horse connected to a pulley system inside which can be used in the frequently cold winter weather.

Comparison with clothes dryer

Both clothes lines and clothes dryers serve the same purpose: drying clothes that have been recently washed, or that are wet in general. Here are some advantages and disadvantages of using a clothes line instead of a mechanical dryer:

Advantages
 Saves money.
 Zero greenhouse gas emissions per load (2 kg CO2eq of greenhouse gas emissions from the average mechanical clothes dryer per load).
 Less fabric wear and tear.
 Laundry items do not shrink (hot air from a mechanical clothes dryer may shrink items).
 No static cling and no perfume smells throughout the neighborhood from fabric softener and anti-static dryer sheets.
 Laundry items stay softer to the touch (mechanical clothes dryers tend to remove short, soft, fine fibers), and may be less wrinkled.
 Laundry items often do not need ironing if line dried in a breeze.
 Avoids the potential of airborne lint and reduced air quality.
 Eliminates the noise from a mechanical clothes dryer.
 Does not vent indoor air to the outside and waste the large volume of conditioned (heated or cooled) air that a mechanical dryer's blower does.
 For a simple line drying arrangement (rope and clothes pins) the repair and replacement costs are about $20.00 per 1,000 loads of laundry or 2 cents per load. For non-commercial mechanical clothes drying the repair and replacement costs (including labor expenses) are about $200.00 per 1,000 loads of laundry or 20 cents per load.

Disadvantages
 Putting laundry on a line usually takes more time than putting it into a mechanical dryer (as laundry items have to be hung up and fixed one by one).
 Laundry items need to be hung indoors during rainy weather, or may get wet if the weather changes.
 Neighbors may find it aesthetically unpleasant.
 Exposing laundry can lessen privacy, showing information about inhabitants' living habits.
 There may be a risk of theft or vandalism of clothes depending on where the clothes are hung.
 Environmental contaminants such as soil, dust, smoke, automotive or industrial pollutants, pollen and bird and animal droppings can come in contact with clothing.
 Clothespins can leave imprints on the clothes.
 The line presents a hazard to pedestrians, depending on line mounting height, pedestrian height, and lighting conditions.

Drying laundry indoors

Laundry may be dried indoors rather than outdoors for a variety of reasons including:

 inclement weather
 physical disability
 lack of space for a line
 reduce the damage to fabrics from sun's UV rays
 legal restrictions
 to raise the humidity level indoors, and lower the air temperature indoors
 convenience
 to preserve privacy and as a safeguard against vandalism

Several types of devices are available for indoor drying. A clotheshorse can help save space in an apartment, or clothes lines can be strung in the basement during the winter. Small loads can simply be draped over furniture or a shower curtain pole. The drying time indoors will typically be longer than outdoor drying because of the lack of direct solar radiation and the convective assistance of the wind.

The evaporation of the moisture from the clothes will cool the indoor air and increase the humidity level, which may or may not be desirable. In cold, dry weather, moderate increases in humidity make most people feel more comfortable.  In warm weather, increased humidity makes most people feel even hotter.  Increased humidity can also increase growth of fungi, which can cause health problems.

A typical 4 kg load of laundry can contain 2.2 kg of water, after being spun in a laundry machine. To determine how much heat has been converted in drying a load of laundry, weigh the clothes when they are wet and then again after the clothes have dried. The difference is the weight of the water that was evaporated from them. Multiply that weight in kg by 2,257 kJ/kg, which is the heat of vaporization per kilogram, to obtain the number of kilojoules that went into evaporating the water, or multiply by 0.6250 kWh/kg to get kilowatt-hours. If the moisture later condenses inside the house, the latent heat will return to ambient heat which could increase the temperature of the air in the room slightly. To obtain a good approximation of the effect this would have in a particular situation, the process can be traced on a psychrometric chart.

Factors that determine the drying duration
Various factors determine the duration of drying and can help to decide rather to use a drier or a clothes line
 The environmental temperature - increase of temperature decreases the drying duration
 The environmental humidity - decrease of humidity will decrease the drying duration
 Wind velocity - Sometimes people put a fan near the clothes when drying them indoors
 Direct sun - usually only the external line will be exposed to direct sun, so usually people put the thickest clothes on the most external line.
 Cloth thickness

Drying laundry in freezing conditions
Laundry may be dried outdoors when the temperature is well below the freezing point. First, the moisture in the laundry items will freeze and the clothing will become stiff. Then the frost on the clothes will sublimate into the air, leaving the items dry. It takes a long time and it is usually much quicker to dry them indoors, but indoor drying transfers heat from the air to water vapor, so it is a trade-off between speed and energy efficiency. The added humidity cancels out the reduction in air temperature to some extent.

North American controversy
Controversy surrounding the use of clothes lines has prompted many governments to pass "right-to-dry" laws allowing their use. According to Ian Urbina, a reporter for The New York Times, "the majority of the 60 million people who now live in the country’s [The United States'] roughly 300,000 private communities" are forbidden from using outdoor clothes lines.

, the states of Florida, Colorado, Hawaii, Arizona, California, Illinois, Indiana, Louisiana, Maine, Maryland, Massachusetts, Nevada, New Mexico, North Carolina, Oregon, Texas, Vermont, Virginia, and Wisconsin had passed laws forbidding bans on clothes lines, while Utah allows local jurisdictions to forbid such bans. At least eight states restrict homeowners' associations from forbidding the installation of solar-energy systems, and lawyers have debated whether or not those laws might apply to clothes lines. British filmmaker, Steven Lake, released a documentary in 2011 titled Drying for Freedom about the clothes-line controversy in the United States.

In Canada, the province of Nova Scotia's first NDP government passed An Act to Prevent Prohibitions on the Use of Clotheslines on December 10, 2010 to allow all homeowners in the province to use clotheslines, regardless of restrictive covenants. The province of Ontario lifted bans on clothes lines in 2008. Some affluent Canadian suburban municipalities such as Hampstead, Québec or Outremont, Québec prohibit clotheslines.

Images

See also
 Airing
 Clothes horse
 Drying cabinet
 Enthalpy of vaporization
 Hills Hoist
 Overhead clothes airer
 Penman equation
 Project Laundry List, New-Hampshire, US, organisation to encourage outdoor drying

References

External links

Article about washing lines and clothes pegs
Project Laundry List
"Instructables" article on minimizing the work involved in using a clothes line 

Laundry drying equipment
Domestic life
Domestic implements